Bajpur railway station is a small railway station in Udham Singh Nagar district, Uttarakhand. Its code is BPZ. It serves Bajpur city. The station consists of 2 platforms. The platform is not well sheltered. It lacks many facilities including water and sanitation.

Major trains 
 Kashipur–Lalkuan Passenger (unreserved)
 Bandra Terminus–Ramnagar Express
 Lalkuan–Amritsar Express
 Moradabad–Kathgodam Passenger (via Kashipur) (unreserved)
 Agra Fort–Ramnagar Tri-Weekly Express

References

Railway stations in Udham Singh Nagar district
Izzatnagar railway division